On January 10, 2020, an 11-year-old student identified as José Ángel Ramos Betts, armed with two guns, opened fire at the facilities of Colegio Cervantes Campus Bosque, a private school in Torreón, Coahuila, Mexico, killing a teacher and wounding multiple teachers and classmates. The assailant wore a white t-shirt that read "Natural selection" and pants with black suspenders, which were reported as referring to Eric Harris, one of the perpetrators of the Columbine High School massacre.

Events
At 8:00 a.m. on January 10, 2020, Betts arrived at the institution with two weapons in his backpack: an automatic .40 caliber and another .22 caliber, both owned by his grandfather. At 8:20 a.m., he asked his teacher for permission to go to the bathroom. About 15 minutes later, after noticing that he was taking too long, she went to look for him. Around 8:40 a.m., he left the bathroom having changed clothes and armed himself with the two guns. María Assaf Medina, Betts' English teacher, confronted him and asked him to stop shooting. Media outlets stated that he attacked while dressed in white t-shirt, suspenders and black pants, clothes similar to those worn by Eric Harris, one of the perpetrators of the Columbine High School massacre. Before firing, he said "Hoy va a ser el día" ("Today is going to be the day"). He started firing at the physical education teacher and five other classmates, injuring all of them. He then shot María Assaf Medina, who died instantly, before committing suicide at around 8:43 a.m.

When they heard the shots, teachers from other classrooms ordered their students to take shelter. After the shooting, the authorities cordoned off the area and initiated investigations. Witnesses stated that the child was a student of academic excellence and no previous problems had been reported with him.

Reactions
Mexican President Andrés Manuel López Obrador lamented the event and gave his condolences to the families of the victims, urging the strengthening of school safety and the "Mochila segura" ("Safe Backpack") program while insisting that re-enforcing family values are more important. The "Mochila segura" program is an initiative that reviews the students' backpacks at the entrance of schools in order to detect the possible entry of weapons and drugs. López Obrador's wife Beatriz Gutiérrez Müller also lamented the shooting, and stated that the review of backpacks and childhood behavior should start at home.

The Governor of Coahuila Miguel Ángel Riquelme Solís said that after the shooting, the Safe Backpack program would be mandatory in all private schools in the state. In regards to the shooter's attire, Governor Riquelme Solís stated in a press conference that it was believed to be due to the influence of the video game Natural Selection. After the theory that the shooting could have been committed because of a video game was roundly rejected by experts such as Andrew Przybylsi of Oxford Internet Institute, Feggy Ostrosky Shejet of the National Autonomous University of Mexico (UNAM), Ernesto Piedras of The Competitive Intelligence Unit, Erik Salazar of College of Psychology of UNAM, and several media reports noted that the phrase "Natural selection" was more likely to be a reference to the Columbine High School massacre. After this came to light, the governor retracted his initial statement.

The Secretary of the Interior Olga Sánchez Cordero called on the social networks Facebook and Twitter to remove the images of the shooting that circulated online.

Perpetrator
Once Governor Miguel Riquelme Solís's theory that the 11-year-old had committed the shooting because of a video game was rejected, investigators looked at the shooter's background and environment.

Betts' mother died in an operation a few years earlier, and his 37-year-old father was not present, so the child lived with paternal grandparents. His father had spent time in prison for trafficking methamphetamine in El Paso, Texas, but had recently been released. His grandfather's bank account was frozen because of "irregular money transfers" involving millions of dollars between the two men. Betts' 58-year-old grandfather, José Ángel Ramos Saucedo, also had a record of drug trafficking. He had additionally owned six luxury vehicles in two years, and one grandmother had owned three luxury vehicles and was also involved in large money transfers. Betts' maternal grandmother had been murdered.

The Coahuila prosecutor's office found his grandfather's cell phone, and conversations on WhatsApp published by El Zócalo de Saltillo reveal that the man's daughter wrote, "¿Por qué se la diste, papá, ves lo que pasa? Cuando lo vi no me sorprendí, sabía que fuiste tú quien se la dio" ("Why did you give it to him, Dad, do you see what happens? When I saw him I was not surprised, I knew it was you who gave it to him."), to which the man replied, "No podía detenerlo, fue su voluntad" ("I couldn't stop it, it was his desire.") Saucedo was arrested and charged with homicide by neglect in leaving his guns where a child could access them; he may be charged with money laundering and tax evasion.

Aftermath
Since the shooting, Colegio Cervantes has renewed classes with greatly increased security measures. The Coahuila state office of the Secretariat of Public Education (SEP) has promised to renew the books used for teaching civics and ethics in the 2020-2021 school year. Rodolfo González Valderrama, director of Radio, Television, and Cinematography (RTC) in Tamaulipas says the state will regulate and perhaps remove some video games. Classification will be the same as for movies: AA (children), A (family), B (minors under 18), B15 (teens), C (adults), and D (extreme).

School safety debate
Operativo Mochila ("Backpack Operation"), a program to prevent the introduction of weapons, drugs, and other dangerous contraband into schools, dates back at least to 2001; the shooting in Torreon has reactivated the debate. Educational authorities and teachers generally school screenings (generally by parent groups), while human rights advocates oppose it. Parents at the Colegio Cervantes expressed opposition to the program in October 2019.

Critics of the program, such as Laura Bárcenas Pozos of the Universidad Iberoamericana Puebla, emphasize that school authorities must reinforce the psychosocial area of schools, learn to listen, generate spaces for dialogue, and include parents more in the development of their children. In an interview with El Sol de Puebla, Bárcenas Pozos declared, "Creo que antes de analizar la Operación Mochila, deberían aterrizar en las escuelas la cultura de la paz." ("I think that before analyzing Operation Backpack, a culture of peace should be established in schools").

On January 9, 2020, one day before the shooting in Torreón, the Supreme Court of Mexico announced they would review the 2017 injunction against the Safe Backpack program in Mexico City. At the time, parents argued that children were frightened by the presence of police officers in their schools and that the program violated the right to privacy guaranteed by Article 14 of the Constitution of Mexico.

See also
 List of attacks related to secondary schools
 School shootings in Mexico

References

2020 murders in Mexico
2020 mass shootings in Mexico
21st century in Coahuila
Crime in Coahuila
January 2020 crimes in North America
January 2020 events in Mexico
Murder–suicides in Mexico
School shootings in North America
Spree shootings in Mexico
2020 suicides
Suicides in Mexico
School shootings committed by pupils
Columbine High School massacre copycat crimes